Sequoia Nagamatsu is an American novelist, short story writer, and professor.

Personal life 
Nagamatsu received a Bachelor of Arts degree in anthropology from Grinnell College and a Master of Fine Arts degree in creative writing from Southern Illinois University.

Nagamatsu was raised in Oahu and San Francisco and attended Pinewood School, a private high school in Los Altos Hills, where he attributes his love of creative writing beginning. He currently lives in Minneapolis, Minnesota with his wife, Cole Nagamatsu, their cat, Kalahira, a dog Fenris, and a Sony Aibo robotic dog named Calvino. He has Japanese roots and lived in Niigata City, Japan for about two years prior to attending graduate school.

Career 
Nagamatsu previously taught at the College of Idaho, Southern Illinois University, and the Martha's Vineyard Institute of Creative Writing.

Aside from writing, Nagamatsu currently co-edits Psychopomp Magazine alongside his wife and is an associate professor of English at St. Olaf College, where he teaches first-year writing and creative writing courses. He additionally joined the faculty of the low-residency MFA Program, the Rainier Writers Workshop, which is based at Pacific Lutheran University in Tacoma, Washington.

Selected texts

How High We Go in the Dark (2022) 
How High We Go in the Dark, published on January 18, 2022, by William Morrow, is a literary science fiction-fantasy novel. Bloomsbury acquired UK and Commonwealth foreign rights.

Prior to publication, the book has been named on "most anticipated" lists from Good Housekeeping, Goodreads, Tatler Asia, Bustle, Minneapolis Star Tribune, The Chicago Review of Books, The Philadelphia Inquirer, The Guardian, She Reads, and Tor.com.

The book has also received a starred review from Booklist, who called the book "[b]oth epic and deeply intimate," as well as positive reviews from Library Journal (starred review) and Lightspeed.  Amy Brady with the Scientific American stated that "this polyphonic novel reflects our human desire to find meaning within tragedy. To feel our innate interconnection with all things, to care for one another—strangers, even—during times of immense loss, to learn how to say goodbye, to make things of beauty, and, most essentially, to inhabit and tend a livable planet for all." The book was also listed by Goodreads Readers as a most anticipated read of 2022.

A Publishers Weekly reviewer noted that "Nagamatsu can clearly write, but this exploration of global trauma makes for particularly bleak reading: the novel offers no resolutions, or even much hope, just snapshots of grief and loss.... Readers willing to speculate about a global crisis not too far off from reality will find plenty to think about in this deeply sad but well-rendered vision of an apocalyptic future."

Kirkus provided a poor review, saying the book was "[a]mbitious, bleak, and not fully realized."

Since publication, the novel has been cited as a New York Times Editors' Choice  and has consistently been listed in "best of 2022 thus far" lists in several media outlets including Esquire, Business Insider, Goodreads, and Polygon, among others. The author and cultural critic, Roxane Gay, selected the novel for her Audacious Literati Book Club in March 2022. Gay said of the novel: “How High We Go in the Dark” is ambitious and intricately plotted. It is a beautiful meditation on the way everything in this world—no, in this universe—is intimately connected."

In the summer of 2022, the novel was shortlisted for the inaugural Waterstones Debut Fiction Prize, an award vetted by booksellers from Waterstones bookstores in the United Kingdom. Six titles were selected for the shortlist from approximately 160 books. The novel was also shortlisted for the inaugural Ursula K. Le Guin Prize, an award sponsored by the Ursula K. Le Guin Literary Trust with a cash prize of $25,000, and later named one of two finalists from the shortlist. In the fall of 2022, the novel was included on the shortlist for the reimagined Barnes and Noble Discover Prize  and long listed for the Andrew Carnegie Medal for Excellence in Fiction.

Where We Go When All We Were Is Gone (2016) 
Where We Go When All We Were Is Gone, published May 2016 by Black Lawrence Press, is a short story collection.

The collection received positive reviews from Booklist, Buzzfeed, Strange Horizons, The Rumpus, and Green Mountains Review.

It also received the following accolades:

 Foreword Reviews Indie Book of the Year Silver Medal winner: Short Stories (Adult Fiction) (2016)
 Foreword Reviews Indie Book of the Year finalist: Multicultural (Adult Fiction) (2016)
 Entropy Magazine Best Books of 2016

Publications

Books 
 Where We Go When All We Were Is Gone (2016)
 How High We Go in the Dark (2022)

Selected Short stories 

 "Grave Friends," published Fall 2020 in The Iowa Review
 "Elegy Hotel," published Spring 2020 in The Southern Review
 "The Songs of Your Decay," published April 27, 2016 by Day One 
 "Where We Go When All We Were is Gone," published May 15, 2015 in Green Mountain Reviews
 "The Return to Monsterland," published in Conjunctions, then reprinted September 3, 2015 in Joyland
 "Headwater LLC," published December 31st 2014 in Lightspeed, then republished July 26, 2016 in The Museum of All Things Awesome and that Go Boom 
 "Placentophagy," published November 21, 2014 in Tin House
 "Melancholy Nights in a Tokyo Cyber Cafe," published May 1, 2009 in One World: A Global Anthology of Short Stories

References

External links 

 Official website
 Psychopomp Magazine

Living people
Southern Illinois University alumni
Grinnell College alumni
Writers from Saint Paul, Minnesota
Writers from San Francisco
Writers from Hawaii
St. Olaf College faculty
Year of birth missing (living people)
21st-century American novelists
American male novelists